Ali Akdeniz (born 17 April 1975) is a retired Turkish football midfielder.

References

1975 births
Living people
Turkish footballers
Association football midfielders
Aydınspor footballers
Eskişehirspor footballers
Samsunspor footballers
Fenerbahçe S.K. footballers
Denizlispor footballers
MKE Ankaragücü footballers
Kayseri Erciyesspor footballers
Süper Lig players
People from Aydın